Taipan Catamarans are sailing catamarans, available amateur built or manufactured by Australian High Performance Catamarans (AHPC).

Taipan 4.9
The Taipan 4.9 is either constructed professionally from kevlar/fibreglass or can be home built from plywood. Very few new boats are built with plywood nowadays. New fibreglass boats are only available from the current manufacturer, Concept Fibres, however amateur builders can buy plans to build a plywood boat.

It is a highly popular class in Australia, and is a favourite amongst high-performance racing purists. 

Designed by Greg Goodall And Jim Boyer in the early 1980s the 4.9 metre Taipan was a development of the Mosquito catamaran, lightweight and more similar to the A class in hull design. The sail plan had a higher aspect, and it was lighter overall weight than most North American designs. Rigged and ready to sail the 4.9 weighs a minimum of 231 lb (102   kg). Other features include a wing mast, and later on a spinnaker. The spinnaker has been abandoned among the most competitive racing fleets as the benefit it confers is minimal. Like the Mosquito and Cobra class rules allow to sail the boat cat rigged or sloop rigged.

Class rules were changed in 2019 to allow the use of carbon fibre in construction. 

Taipans are raced at many Sailing Clubs, especially on the east and south coast of Australia. Westernport Yacht  Club currently has the strongest fleet. Many top-tier (e.g Glenn Ashby) sailors have been active in the Taipan class throughout its history.

Specifications
Length   4.95 m (16 ft 2 in)
Beam     2.34 m (7 ft 8 in)
Mast (H) 8.5 m (27 ft 9 in)
Weight Rigged   105 kg (231 lb)
Sail Area – Main   14 m² (147 ft2)
Jib   4.2 m² (45 ft2)
Spinnaker   17.5 m² (188 ft2)
Crew 1 (cat rigged) or 2 (Sloop Rigged)

Taipan 5.7 
The "bigger Taipan 5.7 was designed with the same principles as the 4.9 but made for a larger crew. A crew weight of 350-375 lb (160–170 kg)Two Adult males is the optimal crew for this 5.7 metre (18 ft 8 in) catamaran.  With canted, hulls, heavier wing mast, spinnaker, daggerboards & rudders, this 275 lb (135 kg) catamaran was similar in performance to the Stingray Mk2 and later Nacra 5.8 catamarans. Production of the Taipan 5.7 model was discontinued by AHPC in 2004.

Specifications

Length   5.7 m (18 ft 8 in)
Beam     2.5 m (8 ft 2½ in)
Mast (H) 9.5 m (31 ft 3 in)
Total Sail Area 23.3 m² (251 ft2)
with spinnaker 46.3 m² (498 ft2)
Main 16.1 m² (173 ft2)
Jib 5.3 m² (57 ft2)
Spinnaker 23 m² (247½ in)
Mast 1.9 m² (20½ in)
Mast Dimensions 160 x 74 mm
Approx Rigged Weight 135 kg (270 lb)
Crew - Two

External links
 http://www.taipan.asn.au/
http://www.ahpc.com.au/

Catamarans